Angraecum rhynchoglossum is a species of orchid native to Madagascar.

rhynchoglossum
Orchids of Madagascar